The 1905 United States Senate election in New York was held on January 17, 1905. Incumbent Senator Chauncey Depew was re-elected to a second term in office. He was renominated unanimously after former Governor Frank S. Black dropped his challenge, and easily won the election given the Republican Party's large majorities in both houses.

Background
Republican Chauncey M. Depew had been elected to this seat in 1899, and his term would expire on March 3, 1905.

At the State election in November 1904, large Republican majorities were elected for a two-year term (1905-1906) in the State Senate, and for the session of 1905 to the Assembly. The 128th State Legislature met from January 3, 1905, on at Albany, New York.

Candidates

Republican caucus
Late in 1904, Ex-Governor Frank S. Black tried to be nominated to succeed Depew. Black was supported by Governor Benjamin B. Odell, Jr., but after intense fighting behind the scenes, Odell finally dropped Black and accepted Depew's re-election which had been supported by his fellow Senator Thomas C. Platt and Speaker S. Frederick Nixon.

The Republican caucus met on January 16. They re-nominated the incumbent U.S. Senator Chauncey M. Depew unanimously.

Democratic caucus
The Democratic caucus met also on January 16. They nominated again Smith M. Weed who had been the candidate of the Democratic minority in the U.S. Senate election of 1887.

Result
Chauncey M. Depew was the choice of both the Assembly and the State Senate, and was declared elected.

Note: The votes were cast on January 17, but both Houses met in a joint session on January 18 to compare nominations, and declare the result.

Aftermath
Depew remained in the U.S. Senate until March 3, 1911. In 1911, Depew was defeated for re-election by Democrat James A. O'Gorman after a deadlock of two months and a half.

Notes

Sources
 Members of the 59th United States Congress
 
 
 
 
 
 

1905
United States Senate
New York